Sergey Anatolyevich Gaplikov, born in 1970, is a Russian politician who served as Head of the Komi Republic from September 2015 to April 2020.

Family

His family is based in Moscow. He has a wife, Galina Yevgenyevna, and their two children, Daria and Aleksandr.

References

External links 
 Биография на официальном портале Республики Коми

Heads of the Komi Republic
Living people
1970 births
People from Bishkek